Hanaa is a Maldivian web series directed by Amjad Ibrahim and distributed by Basikoafu. Produced by Kid Productions, the series stars Ali Azim, Aminath Noora, Ibrahim Jihad and Ali Shameel in pivotal roles.

Cast

Main
 Ali Azim as Yanaal
 Aminath Noora as Hanaa
 Ibrahim Jihad as Rizaan
 Ali Shameel as Hameed; Yanaal's father
 Qulishthaan Mohamed as Nahidha; Yanaal's mother
 Fathimath Latheefa as Fareedha; Hanaa's mother
 Aminath Nisha as Samaa

Recurring
 Reehan Riyaz as Abaan
 Gamariyya Gasim as Mareena

Guest
 Mariyam Ali
 Ali Aashiru
 Mohamed Wildhan
 Mariyam Afaa
 Evaan Ismail
 Mohamed Ibrahim

Episodes

Development
The plot of the series was developed by director Amjad Ibrahim. Producer Hussain Munawwar assigned screenwriter Aishath Rinaza, to write a thirteen episodes drama series based on a love-triangle. Filming for the series commenced on 15 October 2019 in ADh. Maamigili and was completed within fifteen days. Dubbing and editing of the series was simultaneously completed on location. Composition of back music of the series was completed in late December 2020.

Soundtrack

Release and reception
The series was initially planned to be released in November 2019. However, with regards to the delay in back music, the series was pushed for a 2020 release. A teaser trailer of the series was released on 12 February 2020. On 15 February 2020, it was revealed that the series will be made available for streaming through Basikoafu on 27 February 2020.

On release, the film received mixed to negative reviews from critics. Ahmed Jaishan from Sun called the film an "outdated melodrama, re-created from the 90s”. Praising the chemistry and the "eternal love" of the parents, Hameed and Nahidha, Jaishan is pleased with the acting performance of Azim and Jihad though he noted that Noora is "camera unfriendly and shy" in most scenes.

References

Serial drama television series
Maldivian television shows
Maldivian web series